The 1999–2000 season was the 54th season in Rijeka's history. It was their 9th season in the Prva HNL and 26th successive top tier season.

Competitions

Prva HNL

Classification

Results summary

Results by round

Matches

Prva HNL

Source: HRnogomet.com

Croatian Cup

Source: HRnogomet.com

UEFA Champions League

Source: HRnogomet.com

Squad statistics
Competitive matches only.  Appearances in brackets indicate numbers of times the player came on as a substitute.

See also
1999–2000 Prva HNL
1999–2000 Croatian Cup
1999–2000 UEFA Champions League

References

External links
 1999–2000 Prva HNL at HRnogomet.com
 1999–2000 Croatian Cup at HRnogomet.com 
 Prvenstvo 1999.-2000. at nk-rijeka.hr

HNK Rijeka seasons
Rijeka